54th General Assembly of Nova Scotia represented Nova Scotia between November 6, 1984, and July 30, 1988, its membership being set in the 1984 Nova Scotia general election.

Division of seats

The division of seats within the Nova Scotia Legislature after the General Election of 1984

List of members

† denotes the speaker



References 
 

Terms of the General Assembly of Nova Scotia
1984 establishments in Nova Scotia
1988 disestablishments in Nova Scotia
20th century in Nova Scotia